Bootjack is an unincorporated community and census-designated place in Mariposa County, California, United States. The population was 661 at the 2020 census, down from 960 in 2010 and 1,588 in 2000, largely due to reductions in the area of the CDP.

Geography
California State Route 49 passes through the community, leading west-northwest  to Mariposa, the county seat, and southeast  to Oakhurst.

History
There are three current versions of how the town was named: firstly, that a fork in the road made a boot jack shape (basically, a "Y"); second, that a landmark tree at the place had a bootjack shape; and third, that after a horse thief's hanging at the place, a bootjack was used to remove his boots.

Demographics

2010
The 2010 United States Census reported that Bootjack had a population of 960. The racial makeup of Bootjack was 811 (84.5%) White, 2 (0.2%) African American, 34 (3.5%) Native American, 11 (1.1%) Asian, 0 (0.0%) Pacific Islander, 31 (3.2%) from other races, and 71 (7.4%) from two or more races. Hispanic or Latino of any race were 76 persons (7.9%).

The Census reported that 960 people (100% of the population) lived in households, 0 (0%) lived in non-institutionalized group quarters, and 0 (0%) were institutionalized.

There were 393 households, out of which 101 (25.7%) had children under the age of 18 living in them, 221 (56.2%) were opposite-sex married couples living together, 26 (6.6%) had a female householder with no husband present, 17 (4.3%) had a male householder with no wife present.  There were 24 (6.1%) unmarried opposite-sex partnerships, and 4 (1.0%) same-sex married couples or partnerships. 99 households (25.2%) were made up of individuals, and 49 (12.5%) had someone living alone who was 65 years of age or older. The average household size was 2.44.  There were 264 families (67.2% of all households); the average family size was 2.85.

The population was spread out, with 208 people (21.7%) under the age of 18, 59 people (6.1%) aged 18 to 24, 147 people (15.3%) aged 25 to 44, 347 people (36.1%) aged 45 to 64, and 199 people (20.7%) who were 65 years of age or older.  The median age was 49.6 years. For every 100 females, there were 95.1 males.  For every 100 females age 18 and over, there were 97.4 males.

The homeowner vacancy rate was 0.3%; the rental vacancy rate was 7.7%.  683 people (71.1% of the population) lived in owner-occupied housing units and 277 people (28.9%) lived in rental housing units.

2000
As of the census of 2000, there were 1,588 people, 636 households, and 471 families residing in the community. The racial makeup of the community was 92.13% White, 0.31% Black or African American, 4.09% Native American, 0.13% Asian, 0.13% Pacific Islander, 1.07% from other races, and 2.14% from two or more races.  4.47% of the population were Hispanic or Latino of any race.

There were 636 households, out of which 29.6% had children under the age of 18 living with them, 59.6% were married couples living together, 8.3% had a female householder with no husband present, and 25.8% were non-families. 21.1% of all households were made up of individuals, and 10.1% had someone living alone who was 65 years of age or older.  The average household size was 2.50 and the average family size was 2.88.

In the community, the population was spread out, with 25.2% under the age of 18, 4.0% from 18 to 24, 21.2% from 25 to 44, 31.0% from 45 to 64, and 18.6% who were 65 years of age or older.  The median age was 45 years. For every 100 females, there were 94.6 males.  For every 100 females age 18 and over, there were 96.0 males.

The median income for a household in the community was $30,991, and the median income for a family was $33,092. Males had a median income of $39,145 versus $24,271 for females. The per capita income for the community was $14,771.  About 8.2% of families and 10.7% of the population were below the poverty line, including 9.8% of those under age 18 and 7.4% of those age 65 or over.

Government

References

Unincorporated communities in Mariposa County, California
Census-designated places in Mariposa County, California
Census-designated places in California
Unincorporated communities in California